Golyshevo is a rural locality (a village) in Klyazminskoye Rural Settlement, Kovrovsky District, Vladimir Oblast, Russia. The population was 11 as of 2010. There are 2 streets.

Geography 
Golyshevo is located on the Klyazma River, 16 km northeast of Kovrov (the district's administrative centre) by road. Klyazminsky Gorodok is the nearest rural locality.

References 

Rural localities in Kovrovsky District